Ekaterina Shulaeva (born 30 May 1987 in Chișinău) is a retired Moldovan-born Canadian tennis player.

Shulaeva has a career-high singles ranking by the Women's Tennis Association (WTA) of 253, achieved on 25 February 2008. Shulaeva also has a career-high WTA doubles ranking of 339, achieved on 17 December 2007. In 2010, she won the $10k ITF São Paulo doubles title with partner Roxane Vaisemberg.

Shulaeva made her WTA Tour main-draw debut at the 2007 Challenge Bell, in the doubles event, partnering Aleksandra Wozniak.

ITF finals

Singles (0–1)

Doubles (1–0)

Junior Fed Cup participation

Singles (6–0)

Doubles (3–2)

References

External links
 
 

Canadian female tennis players
Sportspeople from Chișinău
1987 births
Living people
Moldovan emigrants to Canada